Newport is a small unincorporated community located in Tuscarawas County at latitude 40.359 and longitude -81.343.

It is actually 3.1 miles South from the center of Uhrichsville, Ohio. The elevation is 873 feet above sea level, in the Eastern Time Zone (UTC-5). Observes Daylight Saving Time and is in the Uhrichsville, Ohio ZIP Code of 44683.

Today it is strictly a rural neighborhood with one church, the Newport Methodist Church.

History
Newport was laid out in 1833. The post office at Newport was called Tracy. The Tracy post office was established in 1880, and remained in operation until 1918.

References

Unincorporated communities in Ohio
Unincorporated communities in Tuscarawas County, Ohio